The 2020–21 BBL season was the 34th season of the British Basketball League, the top British professional basketball league, since its establishment in 1987. The season featured 11 teams from across England and Scotland.

Teams

Arenas and locations

Personnel and sponsorship

Coaching changes

BBL Cup

Qualification Stage

Group 1

 
Group 2

Group 3

Quarter-finals

Semi-finals

Notes

Final

BBL Championship

The BBL Championship returned to the three-game series format used prior to the 2019–20 season, for a 30-game regular season. There were 21 Rounds between 3 December 2020 and 30 April 2021.

Standings

Ladder progression
 Numbers highlighted in green indicate that the team finished the round inside the top eight.
 Numbers highlighted in blue indicates the team finished first on the ladder in that round.
 Numbers highlighted in red indicates the team finished last place on the ladder in that round.

BBL Trophy
The BBL Trophy retained the same, 16-team bracket format as introduced for the 2018–19 season. The eleven BBL teams were joined in the first round draw by five invited teams; Solent Kestrels, Derby Trailblazers, Thames Valley Cavaliers, Hemel Storm and Reading Rockets, all from the English Basketball League.

First round

Notes

Quarter-finals

Semi-finals

Final

Playoffs
After changes were made to the 2020–21 Championship structure, the Playoffs returned to the two-legged aggregate series format used prior to the 2019–20 season.

Quarter-finals

(1) Leicester Riders vs. (8) Bristol Flyers

(2) London Lions vs. (7) Cheshire Phoenix

(4) Newcastle Eagles vs. (5) Sheffield Sharks

(3) Plymouth Raiders vs. (6) Worcester Wolves

Semi-finals

(1) Leicester Riders vs. (4) Newcastle Eagles

(2) London Lions vs. (3) Plymouth Raiders

Final

(2) London Lions vs. (4) Newcastle Eagles

Awards

2020–21 BBL Team of the Year 

Source: 2020–21 Molten BBL Team of the Year

2020–21 BBL All-British Team of the Year 

Source: 2020–21 BBL All-British Team of the Year

2020–21 BBL Defensive Team of the Year 

Source: 2020–21 BBL Defensive Team of the Year

 Most Valuable Player: Geno Crandall (Leicester Riders)
 Play-off Final MVP: Cortez Edwards (Newcastle Eagles)
 Coach of the Year: Rob Paternostro (Leicester Riders)

British clubs in European competitions

*Note: FIBA has withdrawn the London Lions from the FIBA Europe Cup Regular-season due to COVID-19 disruptions. All games of the London Lions will be forfeited.

Notes

References

External links

British Basketball League seasons
2020–21 in British basketball
Britain